Rachel Helleur is a British cellist and member of the Berlin Philharmonic Orchestra.

Biography 
Born in Ipswich, Rachel studied cello at the Royal Academy of Music in London, and later in Berlin at the Hochschule für Musik "Hanns Eisler". She finished her official training at the Berlin Philharmonic Academy. Helleur then went on to play as a guest musician with the Philharmonia Orchestra, the London Philharmonic Orchestra, the London Symphony Orchestra, Bavarian Radio Symphony Orchestra, and the NDR Elbphilharmonie Orchestra. In 2009 she joined the Berlin Philharmonic Orchestra.

Since 2009, cellist Rachel Helleur-Simcock has been a permanent member of the Berliner Philharmoniker, and was previously a member of their Karajan Academy. This portrait of the series The Berliner Philharmoniker and their instruments shows the musician in symphony concerts and at work with her string quartet. Helleur-Simcock also describes her 18th-century Italian instrument whose sound she associates with wood and honey.

References 

Year of birth missing (living people)
Living people
Alumni of the Royal Academy of Music
Players of the Berlin Philharmonic
British classical cellists
Women classical cellists
21st-century British women musicians
21st-century British musicians
21st-century classical musicians
Hochschule für Musik Hanns Eisler Berlin alumni